James Findlay (5 October 1854 – 19 October 1924) was the 15th mayor of Vancouver, British Columbia. Born in Montreal, he moved to Vancouver in June 1887.

Findlay defeated incumbent Louis Taylor by 1314 votes and became mayor for 1912, but he did not seek another term beyond that year.

References

External links
Vancouver History: list of mayors, accessed 20 August 2006
 

1854 births
1924 deaths
Mayors of Vancouver
Politicians from Montreal
Anglophone Quebec people
Burials at Mountain View Cemetery (Vancouver)
20th-century Canadian politicians